= Mudrīte =

Female given name

- Gender: Female
- Name day: October 24

Origin
- Region of origin: Latvia

Mudrīte is a Latvian feminine given name. The associated name day is October 24.
